The Guanzi is an ancient Chinese political and philosophical text. At over 135,000 characters long, the Guanzi is one of the longest early Chinese philosophical texts.  This anonymously written foundational text covers broad subject matter, notably including price regulation of commodities via the concept of  "light and heavy" (轻重). It is one of the most representative text of developing concepts of political economy Warring States era.

Authorship 
The Guanzi is named for and traditionally attributed to the 7th century BCE philosopher and statesman Guan Zhong, who served as Prime Minister to Duke Huan of Qi. It was, however, written by several anonymous authors and precise date of creation remains subject to historical debate. The Han Dynasty scholar Liu Xiang edited the received Guanzi text circa 26 BCE. It contains a wide variety of material from many different authors over several successive centuries, largely associated with the 4th century BCE Jixia Academy in the Qi capital of Linzi, but much of it may actually not have been compiled until after the book Han Feizi (mid 3rd century BCE). 

The Ming dynasty agricultural scientist Xu Guangqi frequently cited the Guanzi and the Xunzi.

Content
As is typical of an ancient Chinese text, the organization of the Guanzi has been altered over time, both the chronology and  significance of which isn't all that clear. Covering a wide variety of subjects, ranging from detailed economic discussions to overviews of local soil topography, many chapters include Confucian values as a necessity for the state, expressing a blend of what may be considered Legalistic, Confucian, and Daoistic philosophy that has been termed "Huang-Lao". The first reference to the collection appears in the more Daostic Huainanzi, of the early Han dynasty, and Han bibliographies listed the text as Daoist. For example, the Neiye ("Inner Enterprise/Training") chapter has the oldest recorded descriptions of Daoist meditation techniques.

When you enlarge your mind and let go of it,
When you relax your [qi 氣] vital breath and expand it, 
When your body is calm and unmoving: 
And you can maintain the One and discard the myriad disturbances. 
You will see profit and not be enticed by it, 
You will see harm and not be frightened by it. 
Relaxed and unwound, yet acutely sensitive, 
In solitude you delight in your own person. 
This is called "revolving the vital breath": 
Your thoughts and deeds seem heavenly. (24, tr. Roth 1999:92) 

It was classed as Legalist after the Sui dynasty (581-617). Most chapters of the text deal with government and the art of rulership. Considering their tone generally less strident than in the classic Legalist work, the Book of Lord Shang (Shang jun shu 商君書), translator W. Allyn Rickett dissents from the traditional Confucian view of the texts as Legalist, judging them to "present a point of view much closer to that of the realistic Confucian, Xunzi than either the highly idealistic Confucianism of Mencius or the Draconian Legalism advocated by Shang Yang." The Guanzi shares with other "Legalist" texts the view that power is independent of morality, emphasizing techniques (Shu), but advocates "law" (Fa) as an adjunct to Confucian Li.

Economic and financial insight in the Guanzi

Several chapters of the Guanzi address what modern language would call economic and monetary issues. It is a core text on the matter of price stabilization form the ancient Chinese perspective. The economic policies discussed focus on insulating peasants from fluctuations in the context of then-recently developed market forces and to increase commercialization while benefitting the state. “[T]his approach to economic policy suggested that the state should unleash and harness market forces in order to promote wealth for the state and the people.”

The "state savings" (國蓄) chapter has been described as the first-ever exposition of the quantity theory of money, and the "light and heavy" (轻重) chapter as the first clear articulation of the law of supply and demand:

In the Guanzi's usage of "heavy," and "light," the former connotes something that is expensive or important while the latter connotes inexpensive or unimportant. In this view, "all economic phenomena can only be understood relationally; things can be heavy or light only in relation to other things."

See also
Shen Dao
Zou Yan

References

Citations

Sources 
 Works cited

 
 Roth, Harold. Original Tao: inward training (nei-yeh) and the foundations of Taoist mysticism. Columbia University Press. 1999.

External links

Guanzi 管子, Ulrich Theobald
 Unraveling Early Daoist Oral Traditions in Guan Zi's "Purifying the Heart-Mind (Bai Xin)," "Art of the Heart-Mind (Xin Shu)," and "Internal Cultivation (Nei Ye)," Dan G. Reid 
Legalism, Qin Empire and Han Dynasty, Sanderson Beck
Guanzi 管子 (Full text in Chinese)
Nei Ye, translation of Bram den Hond
Sixteen Chapters on Weighing and Balancing Economic Factors (《管子·轻重十六篇》): Chaps. 72 - 73
The New Legalist
Guanzi 管子 Full text in Chinese
Guanzi 《管子》 Chinese text with matching English vocabulary

Ancient Chinese philosophical literature
Taoist texts
Legalist texts
Zhou dynasty texts